Estadio Tierra de Campeones is an athletics and football stadium in Iquique, Tarapaca Region, Chile.  It is the home stadium of Deportes Iquique.  The stadium which was built in 1993, was demolished in 2016, and re-opened in 2020. 

In 1997 the stadium was one of the venues for the 1997 South American U-20 Championship.

In April and May 2009 it hosted 2009 South American Under-17 Football Championship as the main and only venue.

External links
Stadium information

Tierra de Campeones
Sports venues in Tarapacá Region
Sports venues completed in 1993
Iquique
1993 establishments in Chile